Donatus was Bishop of Killala from 1235.

References

13th-century Roman Catholic bishops in Ireland
Bishops of Killala